Pablo Alicea (born 7 July 1963) is a Puerto Rican basketball player. He competed in the men's tournament at the 1996 Summer Olympics.

Professional career
Alicea played for four franchises in the Baloncesto Superior Nacional. He began in 1988 with Gigantes de Carolina. After three seasons there he took a break from the league. He returned in 1999 with Cangrejeros de Santurce. He was traded for the 2000 season to Hatillo (now defunct). He took another break before returning to play with his final team, Capitanes de Arecibo, in 2004-2005. He retired from professional basketball at the conclusion of the 2005 season. Alicea was a police officer in the Puerto Rico Police Department, then he went on to join the Baltimore Police Department.

References

External links
 

1963 births
Living people
Baltimore Police Department officers
People from Santurce, Puerto Rico
Puerto Rican police officers
Puerto Rican men's basketball players
Piratas de Quebradillas players
Olympic basketball players of Puerto Rico
Basketball players at the 1996 Summer Olympics